The Solotchinskoye peat railway is located in Ryazan Oblast, Russia.

Current status 
Solotchinskoye peat railway emerged in the 1950s, in the area Ryazansky District, in a settlement named Priozerny. Railway was built for hauling peat and workers in 1995 the railway was dismantled. Work restoration railway started in 2010, work continued throughout the year. A peat briquette factory was built and put into operation in 2010 in a settlement named Priozerny.

Rolling stock

Locomotives 
TU6A – № 2917
ESU2A – № 402, 1003
TD-5U Pioneer

Railroad car
Flatcar
Snowplow
Track laying cranes
Open wagon for peat
Hopper car to transport track ballast

Gallery

See also
Narrow-gauge railways in Russia
Mesherskoye peat narrow-gauge railway

References and sources

External links

  Official Website 
 Photo - project «Steam Engine» 
 «The site of the railroad» S. Bolashenko 

750 mm gauge railways in Russia
Rail transport in Ryazan Oblast